The Walter Willson Cobbett Medal is awarded annually by the Worshipful Company of Musicians "in recognition of services to Chamber Music". It was established in 1924 and endowed with £50 by Walter Willson Cobbett (1847–1937), an amateur violinist and expert on chamber music who went on to serve as the company's master in 1928–29. The medal is silver-gilt and features a portrait of Ludwig van Beethoven.

Recipients 

 1924: Thomas Frederick Dunhill
 1925: Mrs. Frederick Coolidge (United States)
 1926: Alfred J. Clements
 1927: Harry Waldo Warner
 1928: Edward Elgar
 1929: Frank Bridge
 1930: Ralph Vaughan Williams
 1931: Arnold Bax
 1932: John Ireland
 1933: Charles Wood (awarded posthumously)
 1934: Cecil Armstrong Gibbs
 1935: Richard Watkins
 1936: Donald Tovey
 1937: Pablo Casals
 1938: Ivor James
 1939: Herbert Withers
 1940: Isolde Menges
 1942: Ernest Walker
 1943: Sidney Griller
 1944: Myra Hess
 1945: Herbert Walenn
 1946: Lionel Tertis
 1947: William Walton
 1948: Michael Tippett
 1949: Gordon Jacob
 1950: Dennis Brain
 1951: Gerald Moore
 1952: Frederick Thurston
 1953: Arthur Bliss
 1954: Leon Goossens
 1955: Edmund Rubbra
 1956: Arthur Benjamin
 1957: Thurston Dart
 1958: Kathleen Long
 1959: Yehudi Menuhin
 1960: George Malcolm
 1961: Lennox Berkeley
 1962: Anne Macnaghten
 1963: Norbert Brainin
 1964: Emmanuel Hurwitz
 1965: Joan Dickson
 1966: Howard Ferguson
 1967: Kenneth Leighton
 1968: Elizabeth Maconchy
 1969: Hugh Bean
 1970: Cecil Aronowitz
 1971: Watson Forbes
 1972: Denis Matthews
 1975: Janet Craxton
 1976: Gordon Crosse
 1977: Ivor Newton
 1978: Wilfrid Parry
 1979: Edwin Roxburgh
 1981: Hugh Maguire
 1985: Christopher Hogwood
 1986: Philip Jones
 1987: Peter Maxwell Davies
 1988: Evelyn Barbirolli
 1989: Jack Brymer
 1990: Sidonie Goossens
 1991: Eileen Croxford
 1992: Elgar Howarth
 1993: Nona Liddell
 1994: Irvine Arditti
 1995: Levon Chilingirian
 1996: Amelia Freedman
 1997: Yfrah Neaman
 1998: David Takeno
 1999: Richard Sotnick
 2000: Christopher Rowland
 2001: William Lyne
 2002: Julian Bream
 2003: John Woolf
 2004: Sigmund Nissel
 2005: Peter Cropper
 2006: John Underwood
 2007: Martin Lovett
 2008: Joseph Horovitz
 2009: Graham Johnson
 2010: Stephen Dodgson
 2011: Stephen Kovacevich
 2012: Malcolm Singer
 2013: Susan Tomes
 2014: Richard Ireland
 2015: Trevor Pinnock
 2016: Steven Isserlis, CBE
 2017: Kenneth Sillito
 2018: William Bennett, OBE
 2019: John Gilhooly, OBE

References 

British music awards
Chamber music
Medals